Mary Wilshire (born 1953) is an American comics artist best known for her work on Red Sonja and Firestar for Marvel Comics.

Early life
Mary Wilshire graduated from the Pratt Institute with a Bachelor of Fine Arts in painting.

Career
Mary Wilshire began her career in the comics industry drawing underground comix. Her earliest credited work was "Those Beautiful Babes in their Bain de Soleil", a four-page story in Wet Satin #2 (April 1978) published by Last Gasp. In 1980, she was hired by editor Larry Hama to work on Crazy Magazine for Marvel Comics. She became the artist of the Red Sonja series in 1983 and drew the comics adaptation of the character's 1985 film. Wilshire and writer Louise Simonson co-created Alistair Smythe, an enemy of Spider-Man, in The Amazing Spider-Man Annual #19 (1985). After a brief stint as the artist of the New Mutants, Wilshire collaborated with Tom DeFalco on the Firestar limited series. She then drew a Power Girl story for Secret Origins vol. 2 #11 (Feb. 1987).

Wilshire drew "The Amazing Travel Bureau" feature in National Geographic World for several years. In 2006, she illustrated the Fat Free: The Amazing All-True Adventures of Supersize Woman! graphic novel published by Penguin/Tarcher. Publishers Weekly noted in their review of the book, "Wilshire's limpid-eyed charcoal sketches are sensitive and touching, and give a sophisticated sense of person and place. If anything saves the day, it's Wilshire's gorgeous art, not the message."

Bibliography

DC Comics

 The Big Book Of Freaks (1996)
 History of the DC Universe HC (1988)
 The Outsiders #14 (1986)
 Secret Origins vol. 2 #11 (Power Girl) (1987)
 Who's Who: The Definitive Directory of the DC Universe #7 (Duo Damsel entry) (1985)
 Who's Who: Update '87 #4 (Power Girl entry) (1987)
 Wonder Woman Annual #2 (1989)

Fantagraphics Books
 The Complete Wimmen's Comix #1–2 (2016)

Friends of Lulu
 Friends of Lulu: Storytime #1 (2000)

Hassle Free Press
 The Best of Wimmen's Comix (1979)

HM Communications, Inc.
 Heavy Metal #v5#12, #v6#8, #v6#12, #v7#6 (1982–1983)

Last Gasp
 After/Shock: Bulletins from Ground Zero (1981)
 Strip AIDS U.S.A. (1988)
 Wet Satin #2 (1978)
 Wimmen's Comix #8–9 (1983–1984)
 Young Lust #6 (1980)

Marvel Comics

 The Amazing Spider-Man Annual #19 (1985)
 Barbie #1, 6, 11, 20, 23–24, 40, 46, 52, 59 (1991–1995)
 Barbie Fashion #13, 16, 25, 39, 41–42, 50–51 (1992–1995)
 Crazy Magazine #65–66, 68–69, 71–72, 74–75, 77–92 (1980–1982)
 Disney's the Little Mermaid #1 (1994)
 Droids #5 (1986)
 Firestar #1–4 (1986)
 Ka-Zar the Savage #30, 32 (1984)
 Life of Christ: The Christmas Story #1 (1993)
 Life of Christ: The Easter Story #1 (1993)
 Marvel Saga #22 (1987)
 Marvel Super Special #38 (Red Sonja movie adaptation) (1985)
 New Mutants #35–37 (1986)
 Official Handbook of the Conan Universe #1 (1986)
 Official Handbook of the Marvel Universe #14 (Miss America entry) (1984)
 Official Handbook of the Marvel Universe Deluxe Edition #2–3, 7, 18 (1986–1987)
 Power Pack #5 (1984)
 Red Sonja vol. 3 #2–4, 8–13 (1983–1986)
 Savage Sword of Conan #83, 89 (1982–1983)
 Savage Tales vol. 2 #3 (1986)
 Spider-Man and Power Pack #1 (1984)

NBM Publishing
 Skin Tight Orbit #1 (1995)

Penguin/Tarcher
 Fat Free: The Amazing All-True Adventures of Supersize Woman! (2006)

Renegade Press
 Renegade Romance #1 (1987)

Trans-High Corporation
 High Times #49 (1979)

References

External links
 
 Mary Wilshire at Mike's Amazing World of Comics
 Mary Wilshire at the Unofficial Handbook of Marvel Comics Creators
 Dare2Draw interview with Mary Wilshire on YouTube

1953 births
20th-century American artists
21st-century American artists
American female comics artists
American graphic novelists
American magazine illustrators
Living people
Marvel Comics people
Pratt Institute alumni
Underground cartoonists